Maricopa is a city in Kern County, California. The population was 1,154 at the 2010 census, up from 1,111 at the 2000 census. The Carrizo Plain is located to the northwest, and the enormous Midway-Sunset Oil Field, the third largest oil field in the United States, is adjacent on the north and east.

Geography
Maricopa is in the extreme southwestern corner of the San Joaquin Valley, on the first rise of land into the foothills of the Coast Ranges, with the Temblor Range, following the San Andreas Fault, trending northwest of town, and the San Emigdio Mountains to the southeast. The climate of the area is hot and semi-arid, with summertime temperatures routinely exceeding . Freezes occur in the winter, with the mean period without freezes being about 275 days. About six inches of rain falls annually in Maricopa.

History
The first post office opened in 1901, and Maricopa incorporated in 1911. The city was named after the Maricopa Indians.

Demographics

2010
At the 2010 census Maricopa had a population of 1,154. The racial makeup of Maricopa was 958 (83.0%) White, 1 (0.1%) African American, 27 (2.3%) Native American, 16 (1.4%) Asian, 2 (0.2%) Pacific Islander, 112 (9.7%) from other races, and 38 (3.3%) from two or more races. Hispanic or Latino of any race were 232 people (20.1%).

The whole population lived in households, no one lived in non-institutionalized group quarters and no one was institutionalized.

There were 414 households, 157 (37.9%) had children under the age of 18 living in them, 191 (46.1%) were opposite-sex married couples living together, 66 (15.9%) had a female householder with no husband present, 34 (8.2%) had a male householder with no wife present.  There were 50 (12.1%) unmarried opposite-sex partnerships, and 2 (0.5%) same-sex married couples or partnerships. 91 households (22.0%) were one person and 33 (8.0%) had someone living alone who was 65 or older. The average household size was 2.79.  There were 291 families (70.3% of households); the average family size was 3.20.

The age distribution was 306 people (26.5%) under the age of 18, 112 people (9.7%) aged 18 to 24, 252 people (21.8%) aged 25 to 44, 349 people (30.2%) aged 45 to 64, and 135 people (11.7%) who were 65 or older.  The median age was 39.4 years. For every 100 females, there were 101.7 males.  For every 100 females age 18 and over, there were 103.4 males.

There were 466 housing units at an average density of 310.3 per square mile, of the occupied units 268 (64.7%) were owner-occupied and 146 (35.3%) were rented. The homeowner vacancy rate was 1.8%; the rental vacancy rate was 9.8%.  704 people (61.0% of the population) lived in owner-occupied housing units and 450 people (39.0%) lived in rental housing units.

2000
At the 2000 census there were 1,111 people in 404 households, including 302 families, in the city. The racial makeup of the city was 85.87% White, 1.98% Native American, 0.45% Asian, 8.91% from other races, and 2.79% from two or more races.  13.50% of the population were Hispanic or Latino of any race.
Of the 404 households 34.2% had children under the age of 18 living with them, 59.2% were married couples living together, 11.1% had a female householder with no husband present, and 25.2% were non-families. 23.5% of households were one person and 9.2% were one person aged 65 or older.  The average household size was 2.75 and the average family size was 3.22.

The age distribution was 29.8% under the age of 18, 7.0% from 18 to 24, 25.8% from 25 to 44, 26.1% from 45 to 64, and 11.3% 65 or older.  The median age was 36 years. For every 100 females, there were 111.6 males.  For every 100 females age 18 and over, there were 105.3 males.

The median income for a household in the city was $27,917, and the median family income  was $31,761. Males had a median income of $31,161 versus $23,333 for females. The per capita income for the city was $15,692.  About 15.6% of families and 21.3% of the population were below the poverty line, including 27.2% of those under age 18 and 4.5% of those age 65 or over.

Government misconduct

Maricopa Fire Department was established in 1910 with Chief F. W. Ball serving as the first fire chief. Maricopa Hospital opened on April 22, 1911 and the city was incorporated on July 25, 1911. Gary Biggerstaff was the chief of police when budget problems forced the city to close its police department in 1998. The Kern County Sheriff's Department provided police services to the citizens of Maricopa from 1998 until 2006 when the city reopened its police department in the old building.

As reported in the Los Angeles Times on July 4, 2011, the Maricopa Police Department has become embroiled in a local controversy playing out through large signs posted on the city's main thoroughfare. The police have been accused of racial profiling and "over-enforcement" regarding traffic violations and frequent towing of vehicles driven by drivers without proof of insurance or with license or license plate infractions. In mid-2011, American Civil Liberties Union lawyer Jennie Pasquarella is quoted as saying, "Maricopa has been a shining example of impoundments gone wrong," and "They're essentially creating a racket to steal people's cars."

The damage done during this era to the city of Maricopa's reputation persists, as recently as May 2022, Reason magazine reported that, "...the town of Maricopa gained a reputation for targeting drivers, especially farm workers, in the hopes that they'd be undocumented immigrants, thus allowing the small police department to impound their cars without much fuss."

Transportation
Maricopa lies at the junction of Route 166 and Route 33.

The City of Taft operates Taft-Maricopa Area Transit, with buses serving Taft and Maricopa.

References

External links 
 
 

1911 establishments in California
Cities in Kern County, California
Incorporated cities and towns in California
Populated places established in 1911